Love's Deep Ocean is a studio album by the Alim Qasimov and Farghana Qasimova. The album contains nine compositions based on mugham.

Track listing

Critical reception

According to Kieran McCarthy, writing for AllMusic, "Stretching through the uppermost limits of a majestic falsetto, dancing from pitch to pitch with unimaginable ease, this man's voice is truly something to behold." Ken Hunt, in the Milwaukee Journal Sentinel, wrote that "lyrics dwell on love in its manifold manifestations, often presented in allegory just as Azerbaijani cuisine wraps ingredients in vine leaves."

See also
Meykhana

References 

2000 classical albums
Harmonia Mundi albums
Alim Qasimov albums